The Vifor class was a group of four destroyers ordered by Romania in 1913 and built in Italy during the First World War. The four ships were however requisitioned by Italy in 1915 and rearmed as scout cruisers (esploratori), subsequently seeing service in World War I. Two were re-purchased by Romania in 1920 and saw service in World War II. The other two were eventually transferred by Italy to the Spanish Nationalists and saw service during the Spanish Civil War.

Construction and specifications

The four warships were ordered in 1913 by Romania, from the Pattison Shipyard in Naples, with the names Vifor, Viscol, Vârtej and Vijelie. Designed by engineer Luigi Scaglia and based on Romanian specifications, the ships were to be large destroyers armed with three 120 mm guns, four 75 mm guns, five torpedo tubes, and have a 10-hour endurance at full speed, as they were required to operate in the limited perimeter of the Black Sea. However, the four ships were interned on 5 June 1915, soon after Italy joined the war. At that time, one ship was completed 60%, one 50%, one 20% and the fourth was yet to be laid down. They were completed as scout cruisers (esploratori) and commissioned on 27 July 1916, with the names Aquila, Falco, Nibbio and Sparviero. Aquila was the first to be completed, on 8 February 1917, followed by Sparviero on 15 July, Nibbio on 15 May 1918 and Falco on 20 January 1920.

The four vessels were part of a planned class of 12 units, as envisioned by the 1912 Romanian naval program.

Each scout cruiser measured 94.7 meters in length, with a beam of 9.5 meters and a draught of 3.6 meters. However, this actually oscillated between 35 and 38 knots, depending on the vessel. Each ship had a complement of 146, with ranges of 1,700 nautical miles at 15 knots and 380 nautical miles at 34 knots. Nibbio and Sparviero were each armed with three 152 mm Armstrong guns and four 76 mm dual-purpose (naval/AA) Ansaldo guns, while Aquila and Falco were each armed with two twin 120 mm guns and two 76 mm Ansaldo guns. Each warship also carried two twin 457 mm torpedo tubes and two 6.5 mm machine guns. Nibbio and Falco could also carry mines, 24 and 38 respectively.

As of World War II, standard displacement amounted to 1,432 tons with a full load displacement of 1,751 tons.

Sparviero and Nibbio were sold back to Romania on 1 July 1920, being renamed Mărăști and Mărășești.

Service with other countries

Romanian service

Mărăști and Mărășești were the most heavily-armed Axis warships in the Black Sea, and had the greatest standard displacement. Upon commissioning by Romania on 1 July 1920, Mărăști and Mărășești were re-classified as destroyers, reverting to their original designation. However, English-language sources of the period refer to the two warships as flotilla leaders, most likely on account of their three cruiser-typical 152 mm guns. Mărăști and Mărășești were refitted at the Galați shipyard in Romania in 1925, and sent back to Naples for rearming in 1926. The two rearmed warships are also known as the Mărăști-class. As of 1939, when the Second World War started, their artillery approached cruiser standards, amounting to nine heavy naval guns (five of 120 mm and four of 76 mm). In addition, they retained their two twin 457 mm torpedo tubes as well as two machine guns, plus the capacity to carry up to 50 mines. They thus became the most heavily-armed warships in the history of the Royal Romanian Navy, apart from the battleship Potemkin, which was de facto under Romanian control for a brief time in July 1905. All these guns increased their standard displacement to 1,460 tons. Three of these heavy guns (one 120 mm and two 76 mm) were removed in order to make room for two 37 mm and four 20 mm anti-aircraft guns plus two depth charge throwers (one of 900 mm and one of 330 mm). Despite having their heavy armament reduced to destroyer standards, the two warships still presented some cruiser characteristics, such as retaining their torpedo tubes mounted on the broadsides instead of the centerline.

On 26 June 1941, Mărăști helped repel a Soviet naval attack against the main Romanian port of Constanța, together with the destroyer Regina Maria and the minelayer Amiral Murgescu. Surprised by the level of resistance and the accuracy of the return fire, the Soviet fleet withdrew, losing the destroyer leader Moskva into a Romanian minefield, laid by the Romanian minelayers Amiral Murgescu, Regele Carol  I and Aurora on 19 June that year. Amiral Murgescu claimed to have shot down two Soviet aircraft during the battle and Mărăști claimed one.

Both warships were active during the Romanian Naval campaign in the Black Sea in World War II, mainly providing escort for Axis supply convoys between Romania, the Crimea and the Bosphorus. Throughout the war, Mărăști carried out a total of 28 escort missions and Mărășești 21. There were 6 escort missions in which both warships took part, resulting in a grand total of 55 escort missions. During these missions, the Axis convoys were attacked numerous times by Soviet submarines and aviation, and many Soviet mines were also encountered. Four of the escorted ships were sunk, one by Soviet aircraft and three by Soviet submarines. On the opposite side, 1 Soviet submarine was sunk, 1 aircraft was shot down and 14 mines were shot and destroyed.

After over 1 year in Soviet service (August 1944 – October 1945), the two destroyers were returned to Romania and the last one, Mărășești, served until 1965.

Spanish service
Aquila and Falco were re-classified from scout cruisers to destroyers on 5 September 1938, but were then stricken from the Italian Navy and were transferred on 5 January 1939 to the Nationalist Spanish Navy, which at that time only had one destroyer available (Velasco). They were renamed Melilla and Ceuta, and saw heavy service, in spite of their poor condition. To conceal the fact that Italy was selling ships to Franco's side, the two warships were often referred to as Velasco-Ceuta and Velasco-Melilla. For further concealment and to increase the similarity to Velasco, a fourth funnel (false) was installed. After the war, they were retained by the Spanish Navy and served mainly as training ships, the last one being stricken in late 1950.

Soviet service
Both Romanian ships were surrendered to the Soviets in August 1944, on the capitulation of Romania, and were incorporated into the Black Sea Fleet as Lovkiy (Ловкий, ex-Mărăști) and Lyogkiy (Лёгкий, ex-Mărășești) but were returned to Romania in October 1945.

Ships

References

Bibliography

Further reading

Cruiser classes
Destroyer classes
Cruisers of the Regia Marina
World War II destroyers of the Soviet Union
Romania–Soviet Union relations
Destroyers of the Romanian Naval Forces